Tinglong Dai is a Professor of Operations Management and Business Analytics at the Carey Business School, Johns Hopkins University, with expertise in the areas of healthcare analytics, global supply chains, the interfaces between marketing and operations, and human–AI interaction. Dai's research primarily examines the health care ecosystem using analytics approaches, with a focus on behavioral, incentive, and policy issues related to healthcare operations management.

In particular, he has worked extensively on the analysis and design of vaccine supply chains, including influenza vaccine contracting, COVID-19 vaccination, and next-generation vaccine manufacturing. He is considered "one of the nation's foremost experts on vaccine distribution."

Career 
Dai earned his B.Eng. in Automation from Tongji University in 2004, MPhil in Industrial Engineering from the Hong Kong University of Science and Technology in 2006, and PhD in Operations Management and Robotics from Carnegie Mellon University in 2013, with Sridhar Tayur and Katia Sycara as his dissertation co-chairs.

Dai joined the faculty of Johns Hopkins in 2013 as an assistant professor in Carey Business School, was promoted to an associate professor in 2018, and became a tenured full professor in 2021. The business education website Poets & Quants named him one of the World's Best 40 Under 40 Business School Professors. For his multidisciplinary research on healthcare analytics and artificial intelligence, he won the Johns Hopkins Discovery Award three times, in 2015, 2020, and 2022, respectively.

At Johns Hopkins University, Dai holds a joint faculty appointment in the Johns Hopkins School of Nursing. He serves on the leadership team of the university-wide Hopkins Business of Health Initiative and the executive committee of the Institute for Data Intensive Engineering and Science.

He has served on the editorial boards of Manufacturing & Service Operations Management, Production and Operations Management, Naval Research Logistics, and Health Care Management Science.

Academic work 
Dai is known for his work in behavioral, incentive, and policy issues in managing healthcare operations. His work has found applications in a variety of settings, most notably in vaccine supply chains, vaccination, organ donation, organ transplantation, diagnostic decision-making, and incorporating AI into healthcare delivery.  His research has appeared in leading academic journals, including Management Science, Manufacturing & Service Operations Management, Marketing Science, and Operations Research, and has won First Place in the Production and Operations Management Society's College of Healthcare Operations Management's Best Paper Competition, the INFORMS Public Sector Operations Research Best Paper Award, and the INFORMS Pierskalla Award for Best Paper Award in Healthcare (runner-up), among other best paper awards.

Throughout the COVID-19 pandemic, Dai has written and spoken extensively about the importance of and means to improving the resiliency and transparency of the U.S. personal protective equipment supply chain. According to a 2021 Fortune Magazine article, "Dai has relentlessly advocated for regulations making supply chains more transparent."

Related to the interfaces between marketing and operations, Dai's work is among the first to introduce inventory and supply chain constraints to the study of sales force compensation, through the study of a series of moral-hazard principal–agent problems.

He co-edited (with Sridhar Tayur) the first desk reference on healthcare analytics, Handbook of Healthcare Analytics: Theoretical Minimum for Conducting 21st Century Research on Healthcare Operations, which was published by John Wiley & Sons in 2018.

Media coverage 
Dai has been quoted hundreds of times in the popular media, including the Associated Press, Bloomberg News, CNN, Fortune, The New York Times, NPR, USA Today, The Wall Street Journal, and The Washington Post, and has appeared on national and international TV, such as CNBC, PBS NewsHour, and Sky News. In 2021, Poets & Quants named him one of the World's Best 40 Under 40 Business School Professors.

Publications

Book

Journal Publications

Book Chapters

References

External links 

 Dai's Johns Hopkins Homepage

Management scientists
Operations researchers
American operations researchers
Business educators
Johns Hopkins University faculty
Johns Hopkins University people
Carnegie Mellon University people
Carnegie Mellon University alumni
Tongji University alumni
Alumni of the Hong Kong University of Science and Technology
American social scientists
Living people
American business theorists
Hong Kong people
People from Baltimore
People from Maryland
Year of birth missing (living people)